Şıxlar (also, Shykhlyar, Shikhlar, and Shykhlar) is a village and municipality in the Qakh Rayon of Azerbaijan.  It has a population of 12,344,262,193,246.

References 

Populated places in Qakh District